Muhammad Arshad Malik is a Pakistani politician who was a Member of the Provincial Assembly of the Punjab, from May 2013 to May 2018 and from August 2018 to January 2023.

Early life and education
He was born on 18 April 1973 in Sahiwal.

He has the degree of Bachelor of Arts and the degree of Bachelor of Laws which he received from Bahauddin Zakariya University in 2009.

Political career

He was elected to the Provincial Assembly of the Punjab as a candidate of Pakistan Muslim League (Nawaz) (PML-N) from Constituency PP-222 (Sahiwal-III) in 2013 Pakistani general election.

He was re-elected to Provincial Assembly of the Punjab as a candidate of PML-N from Constituency PP-198 (Sahiwal-III) in 2018 Pakistani general election His son hassan ramzan is studying in aitchison college .

References

Living people
Punjab MPAs 2013–2018
1973 births
Pakistan Muslim League (N) MPAs (Punjab)
Punjab MPAs 2018–2023
Bahauddin Zakariya University alumni